Jaga Juno (1900 – 22 March 1944) was a Polish actress. She was active in theatre and film in the early 1920s. During the German occupation of Poland, Juno was a Gestapo informant; in a raid by the Home Army in 1943, her husband Kazimierz Junosza-Stępowski was killed while trying to protect her. In March 1944, returning to her apartment after a period of refuge, she was shot and killed by Home Army members.

Select filmography
Tajemnica przystanku tramwajowego (1922)

References

External links

1900 births
1944 deaths
Polish stage actresses
Polish film actresses
20th-century Polish actresses
Executed Polish collaborators with Nazi Germany
Gestapo personnel
Nazis assassinated by Polish resistance
People executed by the Polish Underground State
People executed by Poland by firearm
Deaths by firearm in Poland
Polish civilians killed in World War II

People executed for spying for Nazi Germany